The Minesweeping Division  was a staff division  of the Admiralty Naval Staff first established during World War I (1917-1918) the deactivated. It was re-activated during World War II (1939-1943) before being abolished. It was administered by the Director of Minesweeping Division

History
The division was established during the first world war in May 1917 where it reported to the Assistant Chief of the Naval Staff until 1918. when it was disbanded. The division was reestablished in 1939 at the beginning of world war two and was in operation until 1943 before it was abolished. The division during the latter period was under the supervision of the Assistant Chief of the Naval Staff (U boat and Trade).

Notes

References

M
Military units and formations established in 1917
Military units and formations disestablished in 1918
Military units and formations established in 1939
Military units and formations disestablished in 1943